The Folk of the Fringe (1989) is a collection of post-apocalyptic stories by American writer Orson Scott Card.  These stories are set sometime in the near future, when World War III has left America in ruins.  The stories are about how a few groups of Mormons struggle to survive.  Although all of these stories in this book were meant to stand alone, they each include at least one character from one of the other stories which helps to make them a cohesive collection.

Contents
"West"
"Salvage"
"The Fringe"
"Pageant Wagon"
"America"

This book also includes interior artwork by Glen R. Bellamy, an "Author's Note: On Sycamore Hill" by Orson Scott Card and an "Afterward: The Folk of the Fringe" by Michael Collings.  The essay by Card was originally published in the 55th issue of Science Fiction Review (1985) under the title "On Sycamore Hill: A Personal View".

Many of the stories take place in, or are connected to, a fictional post-apocalyptic state of Deseret around the former Mormon areas of Utah, which was clearly inspired by the historical State of Deseret.

Influences
As with many of Card's other literature, a Christian/Mormon influence is present in this book.

Publishing information

US editions
Phantasia Press 1st ed. hardcover February 1989 
Tor Books hardcover Copyright 1989 no ISBN  printed by R.R.Donnelley & Sons Company
Tor Books paperback August 15, 1990 
Orb Books paperback August 11, 2001

UK editions
Legend Books hardcover March 8, 1990 
Legend Books paperback March 8, 1990 
Legend Books paperback May 2, 1991

See also

List of works by Orson Scott Card
Orson Scott Card
LDS fiction

External links
 About the book The Folk of the Fringe from Card's website

1989 short story collections
Short story collections by Orson Scott Card
Science fiction short story collections
Post-apocalyptic short story collections
Mormonism in fiction
Phantasia Press books